IEC 61000-4-4 is the International Electrotechnical Commission's immunity standard based on electrical fast transient (EFT) / burst transients. This publication is part of the greater IEC 61000 group of standards which is covered under IEC TR 61000-4-1:2016. The current third version of this standard (2012) replaces the second version (2004). The goal of this standard is to establish a common and reproducible reference for evaluating the immunity of electrical and electronic equipment when subjected to electrical fast transient/bursts on supply, signal, control and earth ports.

Note: This tables purpose is a quick overview. It does not contain the same level of detail as the official IEC 61000-4-4.The cause of electrical fast transients (EFT) come from an arc when mechanical contact is open due to a switching process. Given the fast rise time and voltage of these pulses having a solid ground connection is important during the testing process. Testing for EFT often requires a capacitive coupling clamp (CCL), which is employed to add disturbances to nominal signals.

See also 
IEC 61000-4-2
IEC 61000-4-5
Electromagnetic pulse
Surge protection
List of common EMC test standards
List of IEC standards
List of EN standards

References 

International Electrotechnical Commission
Electromagnetic compatibility